Wadgassen is a municipality in the district of Saarlouis, in Saarland, Germany. It is situated on the river Saar, approx. 6 km southeast of Saarlouis, and 15 km west of Saarbrücken.

Religion
Between 1135 and 1792 the Premonstratensian Wadgassen Abbey was located here.

Fusion
 1974: Differten, Friedrichweiler, Hostenbach, Schaffhausen (Saar), Wadgassen (village), Werbeln

Politics

Local council

(as at 24 May 2014)

Mayor
 From 1 May 2014 – today: Sebastian Greiber
 1 May 1988 – 30 April 2014: Harald Braun, SPD
 1974–1988: Dr. Friedrich Mouty, CDU

Twin town
 Arques (Pas-de-Calais), France, since 1979

Economy
Glass industry (Villeroy & Boch).
Mechanical engineering (Firma Koch; since 2007 FL SMIDTH KOCH MVT)
Startup: Factory-Outlet-Center

Museums
 Deutsches Zeitungsmuseum (DZM) in the Abteihof (part of the former Premonstratensian abbey)
 Glashütte Museum: Villeroy & Boch
 Museum Academia Wadegotia –  local history and living history of Wadgassen: Treppenstrasse 13 (csw Neubau), Wadgassen. Founded as institute museum.
 Saarländisches Zweiradmuseum on the site of the Cristallerie Wadgassen (closed on 30 September 2007)

Famous people
 Daniel Braun, author and journalist
 Johannes Kirschweng, poet
 Matthew Greywolf, guitarist of Powerwolf

Sources and external links
 
museum.academia-wadegotia.de (History and living history of Wadgassen)

References

Saarlouis (district)